Capraiellus panzeri is a species of non-cosmopolitan cockroach in the subfamily Ectobiinae: commonly known by its original (genus) name Ectobius panzeri. 

This European species extends into NW Africa and is localised in southern Britain, where it may be called the lesser cockroach.  Recent work indicated that Ectobius panzeri panzeri (i.e. as found in Britain) should be placed in the genus Capraiellus and this has now been confirmed.

References

See also
 List of Orthoptera and allied insects of Great Britain

External links
 

Cockroaches
Insects described in 1835
Insects of Europe